The 2012 United States Senate election in Michigan was held on November 6, 2012, alongside the 2012 United States presidential election, other elections to the United States Senate in other states, as well as elections to the United States House of Representatives and various state and local elections. Incumbent Democratic U.S. Senator Debbie Stabenow was re-elected to a third term after being unopposed in the Democratic primary. The Republican nominee was former Congressman Pete Hoekstra. Stabenow defeated Hoekstra by a landslide 20.8% margin and nearly one million votes.

Background 
Incumbent Debbie Stabenow was re-elected in 2006 with 57% of the vote to 41%. She defeated Oakland County sheriff and former State Senate Majority Leader Michael Bouchard after narrowly defeating Republican incumbent Spencer Abraham in 2000. The deadline for candidates to file for the August 7 primary was May 15.

Democratic primary

Republican primary

Candidates 
Qualified/On ballot
 Clark Durant, co-founder of the Cornerstone Schools
 Gary Glenn, conservative activist (suspended his campaign and endorsed Clark Durant)
 Randy Hekman, former juvenile court judge
 Pete Hoekstra, former U.S. Representative

Filed to run, but failed to qualify
 Scotty Boman (switched back to the Libertarian Party)
 Peter Konetchy, businessman
 Chuck Marino, businessman
 Rick Wilson, retired autoworker and unsuccessful candidate for the 5th district in 2010

Declined to file
 Justin Amash, U.S. Representative
 Saul Anuzis, former Michigan Republican Party chairman
 Frank Beckmann, talk show host
 Mike Bishop, former State Senate Majority Leader
 Jase Bolger, Speaker of the Michigan House of Representatives
 Mike Cox, former Michigan Attorney General
 Chad Dewey, businessman
 John Engler, former Governor
 Terri Lynn Land, former Michigan Secretary of State
 Thaddeus McCotter, former U.S. Representative
 John McCulloch, Oakland County Water Resources Commissioner (dropped out)
 Candice Miller, U.S. Representative and former Michigan Secretary of State
 Rob Steele, cardiothoracic surgeon

Campaign 
The GOP primary campaign was mainly a battle between Hoekstra and Durant as they were the most visible in running campaign ads. Despite Durant's attack ads, Hoekstra was leading in the polls for the Republican nomination.

On July 20 Glenn suspended his campaign and endorsed Durant; however, his name was still on the ballot due to the time of his withdrawal.

Hoekstra ad controversy 

Hoekstra targeted Democratic incumbent Debbie Stabenow with a television ad which ran statewide during the 2012 Super Bowl. The 30-second ad opened with the sound of a gong and showed an Asian woman riding a bike in a rice paddy and talking in pidgin English. The ad is critical of government spending by Stabenow and mocks her name with the Asian woman saying "Thank you, Michigan Senator Debbie Spenditnow". The commercial asks viewers to visit Hoekstra's website which has statistics about federal spending beside images of Chinese flags, currency and stereotypical Chinatown font. In the HTML code on Hoekstra's site the woman in the ad was reportedly previously identified as "yellowgirl." It has since been removed.

Asian-American groups called the ad "very disturbing", national GOP consultant Mike Murphy said it was "really, really dumb", and Foreign Policy magazine managing editor Blake Hounshell called it "despicable." A coalition of black ministers in Detroit called for Hoekstra to apologize. Two of Hoekstra's GOP opponents, Clark Durant and Gary Glenn, questioned whether Hoekstra is the right candidate for Republicans to support. The ad was called "blatantly racist" by Michael Yaki, former aide to House Speaker Nancy Pelosi and a member of the U.S. Commission on Civil Rights. Journalist James Fallows of The Atlantic called it the "most revolting ad". The NAACP denounced the ad as an "unnecessary race card." Some warned the ad would revive discrimination against Asian-Americans in Michigan where smashing imported cars was common in the 1980s, and in 1982 Chinese-American Vincent Chin was beaten to death by two unemployed autoworkers angry about Japanese competition. Critics also pointed out that Hoekstra voted for the $700-billion Wall Street bailout and voted for trillions more in deficit spending while he was in Congress.

A Public Policy Polling poll released on show of February 14ed Stabenow leading Hoekstra 51%-37%. In April 2012, Stabenow's campaign reported that she had had her best fundraising quarter ever, taking $1.5m from January to March 2012, which they say was in part due to the advertisement. Hoekstra's campaign, meanwhile, reported disappointing fundraising numbers for the first quarter of 2012, raising just $700,000, down almost $300,000 from the final quarter of 2011.

Despite the criticism, the ad was a factor in Hoekstra's Republican primary victory.

Polling

Results

Fundraising

Top contributors

Top industries

General election

Candidates 
 Debbie Stabenow (Democratic), incumbent U.S. Senator and former U.S. Congresswoman
 Pete Hoekstra (Republican), former U.S. Congressman
 Scott Boman (Libertarian), college professor and libertarian activist
 Harley Mikkelson (Green)
 Richard Matkin (U.S. Taxpayers Party of Michigan)
 John Litle (Natural Law Party)

Debates 
A number of United States Senate Debates were held in the 2012 election cycle, but none included more than two of the General Election candidates at a time. Incumbent Senator Debbie Stabenow did not attend any of them. Before the primary, non-partisan Tea Party groups hosted debates which were open to all candidates, however all but one were attended exclusively by Republican primary candidates. The exception being the Romeo Area Tea Party Forum, on May 21, 2012, which included Scotty Boman after he changed his affiliation from Republican to Libertarian. Republican Pete Hoekstra had originally been scheduled to participate in the debate, but withdrew because he objected to the participation of one of the candidates. The Romeo forum was hosted by WJR AM radio talk show host Frank Beckmann who said the candidate Hoekstra objected to was Boman.

There were debates in Dewitt, Zeeland, and Dearborn which were attended by both Pete Hoekstra and Scotty Boman who both qualified for the general election.

After the Primary Election, some forums were held which were attended by one of the invited United States Senate Candidates, but only two post-primary debates were held where more than one General Election candidate attended: Libertarian Scotty Boman and Green Party candidate Harley Mikkelson attended Forums hosted by the League of Women Voters of Alpena County on October 23, and Gaylord High School on October 24.

Controversy about debate qualifications 

Since 1996, WGVU and the Detroit Economic Club hosted United States Senate debates that would feature all United States Senate candidates who had met certain qualifications. In 1994 all balloted candidates were included in the televised debate on WKAR, but since then only major party candidates qualified.
Pete Hoekstra and Debbie Stabenow had agreed in principle to debate, but failed to reach a consensus on the number of debates. On October 9 Scotty Boman issued a press release in which he claimed polling results qualified him for the debates. On October 11 the Stabenow campaign issued a statement saying she was "…ending the ongoing debate over debates, due to Congressman Hoekstra's refusal to accept the traditional U.S. Senate debates and his constant political attacks.". The Hoekstra campaign responded, "Debbie Stabenow's campaign refused to negotiate in good faith during the entire process."

Hoekstra continued to ask Stabenow to debate him, and attended at least three debates at which he was the only participant. On October 11 he attended a health care debate sponsored by the Independent Choice Network. On October 18 he attended a debate in Midland which was hosted by a group of local business leaders. Scotty Boman offered to participate in the October 18 debate, but Hoekstra Campaign Manager Greg VanWoerkom said it was too late for Boman to participate since he had his chance to debate Hoekstra before the August primary, when he was running as a Republican. At the time Hoekstra was scheduled to debate with Harley Mikkelson, and Boman at Gaylord High School on October 24, but Hoekstra did not attend it. On October 23 Hoekstra held a debate in Kentwood Michigan.

As an alternative to the traditional WGVU debate, the station produced two back to back interviews with Stabenow and Hoekstra.

Predictions

Polling

Results

By congressional district
Stabenow won 12 of 14 congressional districts.

See also 
 2012 United States Senate elections
 2012 United States House of Representatives elections in Michigan

References

External links 
 Elections from the Michigan secretary of state
 Campaign contributions at OpenSecrets
 Outside spending at the Sunlight Foundation
 Candidate issue positions at On the Issues

Official campaign websites (Archived)
 Scotty Boman for U.S. Senate
 Pete Hoekstra for U.S. Senate
 Harley Mikkelson for U.S. Senate
 Debbie Stabenow for U.S. Senate

2012
Michigan
Senate